CL 1358+62 (ClG 1358+62) is a galaxy cluster located at z=0.33 redshift. Behind the cluster (which itself lies at a distance of about 3.9 billion light years), lensed into a red arc is an infant galaxy (CL 1358+62 G1) that was the farthest object in the observable universe for a few months. It had a record redshift of z=4.92 and was discovered on July 31, 1997 by M. Franx and G. Illingsworth. It is located approximately 26 billion light years from Earth. Its redshift was measured by the Keck Telescope shortly after its discovery. Along with G1, another galaxy also lensed, was found to be at z=4.92 (CL 1348+62 G2). The pair of galaxies were the first things other than quasars to have the title of most distant object found, since the 1960s. The pair of galaxies remained the most distant objects known until the discovery of RD1 at z=5.34, the first object to exceed redshift 5.

See also 
 Physical cosmology

References

External links
Announcement of discovery on Hubble Telescope site

ESA-Hubble

Galaxy clusters
Draco (constellation)